Youness Bellakhder (born 17 June 1987) is a Moroccan footballer who plays as defender for Wydad Casablanca.

Career
Born in Casablanca, Bellakhder began playing football for local side WAC Casablanca. The club sold his contract to Portuguese Liga club C.S. Maritimo during 2009, but Bellakhder never appeared for the first team.

He returned to the Moroccan first division with Raja Casablanca in 2009, helping the club participate in the North African Cup of Champions.

References

External links

1987 births
Living people
Moroccan footballers
Footballers from Casablanca
Wydad AC players
SCC Mohammédia players
Moroccan expatriate footballers
Expatriate footballers in Portugal
Moroccan expatriate sportspeople in Portugal
C.S. Marítimo players
Raja CA players
Fath Union Sport players
Olympic Club de Safi players
Moghreb Tétouan players
Expatriate footballers in Qatar
Moroccan expatriate sportspeople in Qatar
Muaither SC players
Qatari Second Division players
Association football fullbacks